Sébastien Mayer (born March 28, 1970 in Mulhouse) is a French sprint canoeist who competed in the early 1990s. He was eliminated in the semifinals of the K-4 1000 m event at the 1992 Summer Olympics in Barcelona. He is son of canoeist Albert Mayer and father of male kayakist Joanne Mayer.

References

 Sports-Reference.com profile

1970 births
Canoeists at the 1992 Summer Olympics
French male canoeists
Living people
Olympic canoeists of France
Sportspeople from Mulhouse